Neoptera (Ancient Greek néos (“new”) + pterón (“wing”)) is a classification group that includes most orders of the winged insects, specifically those that can flex their wings over their abdomens. This is in contrast with the more basal orders of winged insects (the "Palaeoptera" assemblage), which are unable to flex their wings in this way.

Classification

The taxon Neoptera was proposed by А.М. Martynov in 1923 and 1924, in the following classification:
  
Pterygota
division Palaeoptera
order Odonata
order Agnatha (correct name: Ephemeroptera)
†order Dictyoneuridea
†order Megasecoptera
†order Meganisoptera
†order Protephemeroidea
division Neoptera
superorder Endopterygota
subdivision Polyneoptera
superorder Orthopteroidea (Anartioptera)
order Orthoptera
order Plecoptera
order Dermaptera
order Embioptera
order Phasmatodea
superorder Blattopteroidea (senior name: Pandictyoptera)
order Blattodea
order Mantodea
subdivision Paraneoptera
order Hemiptera 
suborder Auchenorrhyncha
suborder Coleorrhyncha
suborder Heteroptera
suborder Sternorrhyncha
subdivision Oligoneoptera
  
The order Thysanoptera originally had uncertain systematic position, and later was attributed to Paraneoptera.
Other classifications were proposed, subordinating Neoptera  either directly to Pterygota (as in Martynov's classification), or to Metapterygota:

 Pterygota Gegenbaur 1878 
 Ephemeroptera Hyatt & Arms 1890 
 Metapterygota Börner 1909 
 Odonata Fabricius 1793 
 Neoptera Martynov 1923

Phylogeny
The phylogeny of Neoptera is shown in the cladogram, not fully resolved, according to Kluge 2004, 2010, 2012, 2013, 2019, 2020 using morphological characteristics according to the principles of what he calls cladoendesis.

This does not agree with the molecular phylogeny of e.g. Song et al 2016 for the Polyneoptera, who include Zoraptera in that clade, nor e.g. with Kjer et al 2016 for the Endopterygota, who offer a fully-resolved tree for that clade.

References

External links

Insect taxonomy
Extant Pennsylvanian first appearances